Anjala is a 2016 Tamil-language comedy drama film directed by Thangam Saravanan and produced by Dhilip Subbarayan. Vimal and Nandita star, while Gopi Sunder composes the film's music.

Cast

 Vimal as Gavaskar "Gavas"
 Nandita as Uthra
 Riythvika as Anjala
 Pasupathy as Muthirulandi and Appu
 Aadukalam Murugadoss as Kalyana Raman
 Imman Annachi as Jogging Chellapa
 R. V. Udayakumar as Sundaramoorthy
 Ezhil as Boopathy
 Subbu Panchu as UK
 Venkatraman as Gnanaprakasam
 Shahul Master as John
 Vasanth
 Devaraj
 Kadhal Krishnamoorthy

Special appearances in Promotional song by :

Bobby Simha
Deva
Jayam Ravi
Jiiva
Karthi
Raghava Lawrence
Rajendran
Robo Shankar
Samuthirakani
Sasikumar
Sivakarthikeyan
Soori
Sridhar
Thambi Ramaiah
Vijay Sethupathi
Vikram Prabhu

Production
Produced by stunt choreographer Dhilip Subbarayan, Anjala began production in December 2013 with Vimal, Nanditha, and Pasupathi in the cast. The film's cinematography will be handled by Ravi Kannan, editing by Praveen-Srikanth and music by Gopi Sundar. Dhilip's father Super Subbarayan will handle the action segments of Anjala. The film experienced production delays and was later finalized to release during February 2016.

Soundtrack

The film's music and soundtrack was composed by Gopi Sundar. The soundtrack features five songs, the lyrics for which are written by Na Muthukumar, Yugabharati, Gangai Amaran, Yegathasi and Lalithanand. Behindwoods rated the album 2.75 out of 5 and called it "Anjala is a decent fun album that stays honest to its folksy aroma!".

Critical reception
Times of India rated the film 3 out of 5 and wrote "Anjala is an uneven film, with filmmaking that is hardly remarkable and a script that lacks finesse and focus. Yet, the film makes it clear right in the initial scenes that it is more interested in going after our emotions." The Hindu wrote "The foundation on which Anjala is built, is wonderful. But alas. If only the ambition of the makers was to create something more substantial." Behindwoods wrote, "In a nutshell, Anjala might remind you of a similar spot that might have existed in your town too, but it does not drive you to go back there although that may have been the intention of the director." Hindustan Times wrote "As much as the theme of Anjala may be unique, the film's scripting and treatment leave a lot to be desired." Moviecrow wrote "Anjala is an honest attempt with excellent intent. But intent alone never suffices". Silverscreen wrote "A fascinating plot, marred with unnecessary elements like an insipid romance, some crass comedy, and the juvenile treatment of the screenplay leaves us with one overriding thought."

References

External links

2016 films
Indian comedy-drama films
2010s Tamil-language films
2016 directorial debut films
2016 comedy-drama films